Sandra Day O'Connor High School may refer to:

Sandra Day O'Connor High School (Arizona), located in Phoenix, Arizona
Sandra Day O'Connor High School (Texas), located in Helotes, Texas